Bertrée is a village of Wallonia and a district of the municipality of Hannut, located in the province of Liége, Belgium. 

It has a surface area of 2,78 km² and has a population of 414 (1 January 2007).

Geographically 
Bertrée borders in the north to Walshoutem (at the language border to the Flemish region), in the east to Cras-Avernas and Trognée, in the south to Poucet and Hannut, en finally in the west to Avernas-le-Bauduin.

External links 
  
  Information about Bertrée

Former municipalities of Liège Province
Hannut